Fortim d'El Rei is a fort in Mindelo, in the island of São Vicente, Cape Verde. It is located on a hill north of the city centre, in the neighbourhood Fortinho. It was built in 1852 for the defence of Porto Grande Bay and the city of Mindelo. Since 1930, it was only used for civil purposes, and it gradually fell into disrepair.

See also
List of buildings and structures in São Vicente, Cape Verde

References

Buildings and structures in Mindelo
Buildings and structures completed in 1852
1852 establishments in Portugal
Portuguese colonial architecture in Cape Verde